Frank Ramsey may refer to:
Frank Ramsey (mathematician) (1903–1930), mathematician, philosopher, and economist
Frank Ramsey (basketball) (1931–2018), basketball Hall of Famer

See also
Frank William Ramsay (1875–1954), senior British Army officer in World War I